"World's Greatest Lover" is a song written by David Bellamy, and recorded by American country music duo The Bellamy Brothers.  It was released in September 1984 as the second single from the album Restless.  The song reached number 6 on the Billboard Hot Country Singles & Tracks chart.

Chart performance

References

1984 singles
The Bellamy Brothers songs
MCA Records singles
Curb Records singles
Songs written by David Bellamy (singer)
1984 songs